The United Nations Educational, Scientific and Cultural Organization (UNESCO) World Heritage Sites are places of importance to cultural or natural heritage as described in the UNESCO World Heritage Convention, established in 1972. South Africa accepted the convention on 10 July 1997, making its historical sites eligible for inclusion on the list. As of 2021, there are ten World Heritage Sites in South Africa, including four cultural sites, four natural sites and one mixed site.

World Heritage Sites

Name; named after the World Heritage Committee's official designation
Location; at city, regional, or provincial level and geocoordinates
UNESCO data; the site's reference number; the year the site was inscribed on the World Heritage List; the criteria it was listed under. Criteria i through vi are cultural, while vii through x are natural (the column sorts by year added to the list)
Period; time period of significance
Description; brief information about the site, including reasons for qualifying as an endangered site, if applicable

Tentative list
In addition to sites inscribed on the World Heritage List, member states can maintain a list of tentative sites that they may consider for nomination. Nominations for the World Heritage List are only accepted if the site was previously listed on the tentative list. As of 2018, South Africa lists five properties on its tentative list:

Succulent Karoo Protected Areas
Liberation Heritage Route
Early Farmsteads of the Cape Winelands
The Emergence of Modern Humans: The Pleistocene occupation sites of South Africa
Human Rights, Liberation Struggle and Reconciliation: Nelson Mandela Legacy Sites

See also
List of World Heritage Sites in Africa
List of heritage sites in South Africa

References

External links
unesco.org
South African Heritage Resources Agency

 List
South Africa
South Africa geography-related lists
Lists of tourist attractions in South Africa